Billionaires Row, Billionaires' Row, or Billionaire's Row is the nickname of several streets or neighborhoods throughout the world that have residences belonging to some of the world's richest people. Places known as Billionaires Row include:

 Billionaires' Row (Manhattan), a set of super-tall luxury skyscrapers roughly arrayed along southern Central Park, New York City
 The Bishops Avenue, a street in north London on the boundary between the Boroughs of Barnet and Haringey
 Kensington Palace Gardens, a street in west central London
 Pacific Coast Highway (California) (State Route 1) in Malibu, California, particularly the Carbon Beach section
 Meadow Lane in the Hamptons on Long Island in New York State
 Florida State Road A1A (South Ocean Boulevard), in Palm Beach, Florida

See also
 Millionaires' Mile